Pigeon River is an unincorporated community in Cook County, Minnesota, United States; located four miles north of the community of Grand Portage.

The community is situated on the banks of the Pigeon River, which serves as part of the Canada–United States border.

Pigeon River is located at the intersection of Cook County Road 89 and Joe's Road.  The community is near the tip of Minnesota's Arrowhead Region in the extreme northeast part of the state.  Pigeon River is located within the Grand Portage Indian Reservation.

The Grand Portage National Monument is nearby.

Education
All of the county is zoned to Cook County ISD 166.

References

Unincorporated communities in Cook County, Minnesota
Unincorporated communities in Minnesota
Minnesota populated places on Lake Superior